The 2013 Torneo di Viareggio is the 65th edition of Torneo di Viareggio (in English, the "Viareggio Tournament"; officially the "iareggio Cup World Football Tournament Coppa Carnevale"), the annual youth football tournament held in Viareggio, Tuscany.

Format 
The 48 teams are seeded in 12 pools, split up into 6-pool groups. Each team from a pool meets the others in a single tie. The winning club from each pool and two best runners-up from both group A and group B progress to the final knockout stage. All matches in the final rounds are single tie. The Round of 16 after envisions penalties and no extra time, while the rest of the final round matches include 30 minutes extra time and penalties to be played if the draw between teams still holds.

Participating teams
48 teams participate in the tournament. The list of the teams are below.

Italian teams

  Atalanta
  Avellion
  Città di Marino
  Empoli
  Fiorentina
  Genoa
  Inter Milan
  Juve Stabia
  Juventus
  Lazio
  Lecce
  Milan
  Napoli
  Padova
  Parma
  Serie D Representatives
  Reggina
  Roma
  Sampdoria
  Siena
  Spezia
  Torino
  Varese
  Virtus Entella

European teams

  Anderlecht
  B 93 Copenhagen
  Belasica
  Club Brugge
  Hønefoss
  Budapest Honvéd
  Maribor
  Newcastle United
  Recreativo Huelva
  Rijeka
  Spartak Moscow
  Red Star Belgrade

American teams

  All Boys
  Club Nacional
  Deportes Concepción
  Norte América
  LIAC New York
  Long Island
  Mutual Uruguaya
  Santos Laguna

African teams

  Nogoom El Mostakbal
  Congo U-17

Oceanian teams

  APIA Leichhardt
  Melbourne Phoenix

Group stage

Group A

Pool 1

Pool 2

Pool 3

Pool 4

Pool 5

Pool 6

Group B

Pool 7

Pool 8

Pool 9

Pool 10

Pool 11

Pool 12 

 Juve Stabia were awarded a 3–0 win in the game v Mutual Uruguaya even though they lost the game 1–4

Ranking of second-placed teams

Final rounds

Round of 16

Quarter-finals

Semi-finals

Final

Champions

Top scorers 

5 goals (5 players)

  Simone Ganz (Milan)
  Luigi Canotto (Siena)
  Eric Lanini (Juventus)
  Gergely Bobál (Budapest Honvéd)
  Daniel Jara Martínez (Genoa)

4 goals (7 players)

  Federico Bernardeschi (Fiorentina)
  Balde Diao Keita (Lazio)
  Indelicato (Città di Marino)
  Ambrogio Sorriso (Juve Stabia)
  Rubino (Virtus Entella)
  Nathan Kabasele (Torino)
  Willyan da Silva Barbosa (Torino)

3 goals (8 players)

  Amedoro (Avellino)
  Doudou Mangni (Atalanta)
  Bálint Vécsei (Budapest Honvéd)
  Valerio Rosseti (Siena)
  Marco Rosafio (Lecce)
  Frank Acheampong (Anderlecht)
  Wálter Sandoval (Santos Laguna)
  Petar Stojanović (Maribor)

References

External links
 Official Site (Italian)

2013
2012–13 in Italian football
2012–13 in European football
2012–13 in CONCACAF football
2013 in South American football
2013 in Asian football
2013 in African football